Wang Minghui (born February 1960) is a former Chinese politician who spent his entire career in southwest China's Sichuan province. He was investigated by China's top anti-graft agency in January 2022. Previously he served as vice chairman of Sichuan People's Congress. He is the fourth vice-ministerial level official to be targeted by China's top anticorruption watchdog in 2022, after Zhang Yongze , Wang Bin, and Liu Hongwu. He was a delegate to the 11th and 12th National People's Congress. He is a representative of the 19th National Congress of the Chinese Communist Party.

Biography
Wang was born in Ziyang County (now Ziyang), Sichuan, in February 1960. 

He got involved in politics in December 1977, and joined the Chinese Communist Party (CCP) in October 1980. He was deputy party secretary of Ziyang from March 1990 to December 1992 and deputy party secretary of Lezhi County from December 1992 to April 1998. He was appointed deputy party secretary of Neijiang in July 2005, concurrently holding the mayor position. He became deputy secretary-general of CCP Sichuan Provincial Committee and director of its General Office in June 2007, and served until January 2013, when he was made party secretary of Yibin. It would be his first job as "first-in-charge" of a city. In June 2016, he was promoted to become vice governor of Sichuan, concurrently serving as secretary-general of CCP Sichuan Provincial Committee. In May 2020, he took office as vice chairman of Sichuan People's Congress.

Downfall
On 22 January 2022, he has been placed under investigation for "serious violations of discipline and laws" by the Central Commission for Discipline Inspection (CCDI), the party's internal disciplinary body, and the National Supervisory Commission, the highest anti-corruption agency of China. On 29 July 2022, he was expelled from the CCP and dismissed from public office.

References

1960 births
Living people
People from Ziyang
Central Party School of the Chinese Communist Party alumni
People's Republic of China politicians from Sichuan
Chinese Communist Party politicians from Sichuan
Delegates to the 11th National People's Congress
Delegates to the 12th National People's Congress